Puccio is both an Italian surname and a masculine Italian given name. Notable people with the name include:

People with the surname
Alejandro Puccio (1958–2008), Argentine rugby union footballer and criminal
Alessio Puccio (born 1986), Italian voice actor
Alex Puccio (born 1989), American rock climber
Carlos López Puccio (born 1946), Argentinian musician
Gabriele Puccio (born 1989), Italian footballer
Gary Puccio, American college baseball coach
Marty Puccio (born 1973), American murderer
Nicola Puccio (born 1971), Australian born Italian cricketer
Puccio family, Argentinian crime family
Salvatore Puccio (born 1989), Italian cyclist
Thomas Puccio (1944–2012), American trial attorney
Val Puccio (1965–2011), American wrestler
Vincenzo Puccio (1945–1989), Sicilian mafioso

People with the given name
Puccio Capanna, Italian painter
 Puccio Pucci (lawyer) (1904–1985), Italian lawyer and sports official
 Puccio Pucci (politician) (1389–1449), Florence
Puccio di Simone (fl. 1346–1358), Italian Gothic painter

Italian-language surnames
Italian masculine given names